Dave Hoffmann (born July 24, 1970) is an American former professional football player who was a linebacker in the National Football League (NFL). He played college football with the Washington Huskies, earning All-American honors in 1992. He was selected by the Chicago Bears in the 1993 NFL Draft and played for the Pittsburgh Steelers. After his football career, he became a member of the United States Secret Service, protecting presidents Bill Clinton and George W. Bush as well as vice presidents Al Gore and Dick Cheney.

High school
Hoffmann attended Pioneer High School in San Jose, CA.

College
Hoffmann played at the University of Washington from 1989 to 1992. Playing with the Huskies, he was a first-team All-American, Butkus Award finalist, member of the 1991 National Champions, three-time Pac-10 conference champion, two-time All-Pac-10 player, Pac-10 Defensive Player of the Year, and team captain in 1992 for coach Don James.  Following his Washington career, Hoffman played in both the East–West Shrine Game and Hula Bowl.

Hoffmann was inducted into the Husky Hall of Fame in 2012.

References

1970 births
Living people
Players of American football from San Jose, California
All-American college football players
American football linebackers
Washington Huskies football players
Pittsburgh Steelers players
London Monarchs players
United States Secret Service agents